Xie Wenjun (born 11 July 1990) is a Chinese track and field athlete who competes in the 110 metres hurdles. He represented his country at the 2012 Summer Olympics narrowly missing the final.  He also competed at the 2016 Olympics.

He has personal bests of 13.17 seconds in the 110 metres hurdles (Shanghai 2019) and 7.60 seconds in the 60 metres indoors (Birmingham 2013).

International competitions

References

1990 births
Living people
Runners from Shanghai
Chinese male hurdlers
Olympic athletes of China
Athletes (track and field) at the 2012 Summer Olympics
Athletes (track and field) at the 2016 Summer Olympics
Asian Games gold medalists for China
Asian Games medalists in athletics (track and field)
Athletes (track and field) at the 2014 Asian Games
Athletes (track and field) at the 2018 Asian Games
World Athletics Championships athletes for China
Medalists at the 2014 Asian Games
Medalists at the 2018 Asian Games
Asian Athletics Championships winners
Asian Games gold medalists in athletics (track and field)
Athletes (track and field) at the 2020 Summer Olympics